Events of 2019 in Kazakhstan.

Incumbents 

 President: Nursultan Nazarbayev (until March)Kassym-Jomart Tokayev (since June)
 Prime Minister: Bakhytzhan Sagintayev (until February)Askar Mamin (since February)

Events

February 
February 21 – President Nazarbayev fires the government and appoints Askar Mamin as the new Prime Minister.

March 
March 19 
March 20 – Nazarbayev resigns after 30 years in power.
Kassym-Jomart Tokayev is sworn into office at a ceremony in the Parliament of Kazakhstan attended by outgoing President Nazarbayev.
The Parliament of Kazakhstan approves the renaming of the capital city from Astana to Nursultan.
 March 24 – Kazakhstan loses 0–4 to Russia in a match of UEFA Euro 2020 qualifying Group I at Astana Arena.

June 
 June 9 – Early presidential elections were held in the country with seven registered candidates, including incumbent president Kassym-Jomart Tokayev. Tokayev was subsequently re-elected with 71% of the vote.

December 
 December 27 – At least 12 died and at least 60 injured in a plane crush near Almaty Airport.

Deaths

December 
31 December – Serikbolsyn Abdildin, economist and politician (b. 1937).

References

 
2010s in Kazakhstan
Years of the 21st century in Kazakhstan
Kazakhstan
Kazakhstan